Grant Township is an inactive township in Clark County, in the U.S. state of Missouri.

Grant Township was established in 1868, taking its name from President Ulysses S. Grant.

References

Townships in Missouri
Townships in Clark County, Missouri